Casanova is the fourth studio album by Irish chamber pop band the Divine Comedy. It was released in 1996 by Setanta Records, and it happened to be the band's commercial breakthrough. It was certified Gold in the UK in July 1997, aided by the release of the album's first single, "Something for the Weekend", which reached No. 13 on the charts. Two other singles released from the album, "Becoming More Like Alfie" and "The Frog Princess", charted at No. 27 and No. 15, respectively.

Composition
Treble writer A.T. Bossenger wrote that, with Casanova, Divine Comedy frontman Neil Hannon "started going for a more straightforward pop tone as the base for his songwriting", resulting in the album having a more Britpop flow to it. Its central theme is sex, around which all songs on the album centre, except "The Dogs and the Horses", which is the last song on the album and whose theme is death. Jeremy Lee of ABC News considered that this record brought Neil Hannon "closer to the orchestral pop sound he'd been dreaming of."

Casanova exemplifies the influence of American singer-songwriter Scott Walker: "Through a Long & Sleepless Night" shares the same title as a track from Walker's first solo album, while "The Dogs and the Horses" is reminiscent of the chamber pop musical style of Walker's first four solo albums. Two of Casanovas songs were originally composed by Hannon as potential theme tunes for the 1995 sitcom Father Ted: Hannon's first attempt was rejected, and he reworked it to become "A Woman of the World"; his second attempt was accepted and used as the theme for the series, but was later reworked as "Songs of Love", eschewing the original version's guitar for harpsichord.

Recording
Casanova had the longest recording period of any Divine Comedy album up to that point and consequently had a higher budget. Setanta was able to indulge Neil Hannon's desire because of the success of Edwyn Collins' hit single "A Girl Like You".

Casanova featured more musicians than on the band's previous two albums, Liberation and Promenade, but like those two albums, Neil Hannon performed the majority of the instrumental parts himself, with co-producer/drummer Darren Allison directing proceedings. The album's closing track, "The Dogs and the Horses", recorded at Abbey Road Studios, features a large orchestral ensemble which includes future members of the live band, namely Joby Talbot, Stuart 'Pinkie' Bates, Grant Gordon, and Bryan Mills. Talbot was beginning to play an increasingly important role in the band; he arranged and orchestrated "The Dogs and the Horses," and he co-arranged "Theme from Casanova" with Hannon.

Legacy

The album's sixth track, "Songs of Love", made its debut on the popular Channel 4 sitcom Father Ted, officially remaining the show's theme song, as heard in its opening titles and end credits. The song was later covered by Ben Folds on his EP Sunny 16 in 2003 and Peter Bjorn and John as part of Under the Radar's Covers of Covers album in 2022.

The album was included in the 2010 edition of the book 1001 Albums You Must Hear Before You Die. In 2014, NME included the album in its list of "30 Glorious Britpop Albums That Deserve a Reissue Pronto," saying "Gawky Neil Hannon as smooth loverman was a conceit that actually worked and it produced two of Britpop's least obvious classics in the hilarious Cold Comfort Farm-inspired tale of 'Something for the Weekend' and the movie fantasy of 'Becoming More Like Alfie'."

Track listing
All songs written and arranged by Neil Hannon, except "Theme From Casanova", arranged by Hannon and Joby Talbot; "The Dogs & the Horses" arranged and orchestrated by Talbot.

Personnel 
Personnel per CD booklet A Secret History... The Best of the Divine Comedy.

 John Allen – celeste, whistle
 Darren Allison – percussion, drums, producer, engineer, mixing
 Kathy Brown – cello
 Jane Butterfield – trombone
 Andy Chase – producer, engineer, mixing
 Emile Chitikov – violin
 Ian Cooper – mastering
 Eos Counsell – violin
 Rob Crane – design
 Alison Fletcher – violin, viola
 Anna Giddey – violin
 Charlotte Glasson – viola
 Ruth Goldstein – cello
 Tom Gurling – assistant engineer
 Neil Hannon – bass, guitar, percussion, piano, arranger, Hammond organ, vocals, producer, tympani [timpani], art direction, Wurlitzer
 Rebecca Hayes – violin
 Robin Hayward – tuba
 Yuri Kalnitz – violin
 Robbie Kazandjian – assistant engineer
 Mark Knight – violin
 Alex McRonald – flute
 Bryan Mills – bass
 Paul Mysiak – assistant engineer
 Darren Nash – assistant engineer
 Gerard Navarro – assistant engineer
 Gareth Parton – assistant engineer
 Alex Postlethwaite – violin
 Alice Pratley – violin
 Alice Reynolds – laughs
 Joe Richards – cello
 Adrian Roach – oboe
 Laura Samuel – violin
 Padraic Savage – violin
 Chris Scard – assistant engineer
 Joby Talbot – piano, arranger, conductor, alto saxophone, orchestration
 Titch Walker – trumpet
 Jane Watkins – cello
 Kevin Westenberg – art direction, photography
 Chris Worsey – cello

References

External links
 
 
 

The Divine Comedy (band) albums
1996 albums
Setanta Records albums
Orchestral pop albums